Ilumatobacter coccineus is a Gram-positive, aerobic and non-motile  bacterium from the genus Ilumatobacter which has been isolated from sand from the beach of Shimane Prefecture in Japan.

References

External links
Type strain of Ilumatobacter coccineus at BacDive -  the Bacterial Diversity Metadatabase

Actinomycetota
Bacteria described in 2013